The Pan American Racquetball Championships are held annually in the spring with play ending on the day before Easter. Originally called the Tournament of the Americas, the Pan American Championships are hosted by the Pan American Racquetball Confederation.  

The 2023 Pan American Championships will be held in Guatemala City, Guatemala, March 31 to April 8, 2023. This event will also serve as the qualifying event for the 2023 Pan American Games in Santiago, Chile.

The 2022 Pan American Championships were held in Santa Cruz de la Sierra, Bolivia, April 9-16. Bolivian Angelica Barrios won Women's Singles and fellow Bolivian Conrrado Moscoso won Men's Singles, and both Barrios and Moscoso won for the first time. Barrios's victory was the first for a Bolivian woman at Pan Am Championships, while Moscoso's win was the third Bolivian gold in Men's Singles, as Carlos Keller won the previous two events. 

In doubles, Canadians Coby Iwaasa and Samuel Murray won Men's Doubles, which was the 4th Canadian win in the event, but the first for both Iwaasa and Murray. Argentina won Women's Doubles for the first time, as Natalia Mendez and Maria Jose Vargas took the title. It was Mendez's first Pan Am Championship, but the second for Vargas, who won Women's Singles in 2014.

The 2022 Pan American Championships were the first to use rally scoring, which was adopted by the International Racquetball Federation in early 2022. Also, Mixed Doubles and Men's and Women's Team competitions were implemented for the first time. In the team competitions, countries compete head-to-head over three matches: two singles matches and a doubles match. Argentina and Bolivia were the first team champions: Argentina winning the Women's Team competition and Bolivia the Men's Team competition. Mexicans Rodrigo Montoya and Samantha Salas were the first Mixed Doubles Pan American Champions.

The 2022 competition was the first in three years, as the COVID-19 pandemic caused the cancellation of the 2020 and 2021 tournaments. The competition was not held in two years previously. In 1995, the Pan Am Games were held in the spring, so that year's Tournament of the Americas (as the competition was then known) was not held. In 2000, the competition was cancelled due to the civil unrest in Bolivia, which was to host the event.

Champions

Champions by event and year

Champions by country

Team Champions by year

Multiple champions

List of men's multiple champions

List of women's multiple champions

References

External links
 International Racquetball Federation (IRF) site 

Racquetball competitions
Racquetball